St Andrew's Church is in Rollestone Road, Rollestone, Wiltshire, England.  It is a redundant Anglican church in the care of the Churches Conservation Trust.  It was declared redundant on 1 July 1993, and was vested in the Trust on 8 February 1995.  The church is recorded in the National Heritage List for England as a designated Grade II* listed building.

St Andrew's was built in the early 13th century. For the early part of its history, until the Dissolution of the Monasteries, the church was a possession of the Knights Hospitaller. It has been suggested that Jane Seymour was baptised at the church in the early 16th century around 1508, however this may be a confusion with another child of the same name.

It is constructed in flint and stone in a chequerwork pattern. The church consists of a chancel and nave which was given a new roof in the 16th century. Rebuilding work on the chancel and chancel arch were undertaken in 1845. The church has two large Perpendicular windows. The stained glass is 17th century. The font dating from the 13th century and has a 17th-century cover. The oak benches were brought from the redundant church of St Catherine's at Haydon, Dorset in 1981.

Rollestone became part of the parish of Shrewton in the early 20th century. The parish now includes St Mary's Church, Maddington as well.

See also
 List of churches preserved by the Churches Conservation Trust in South West England

References

13th-century church buildings in England
Church of England church buildings in Wiltshire
Grade II* listed churches in Wiltshire
Churches preserved by the Churches Conservation Trust